Waqas Maqsood (born 4 November 1987) is a Pakistani cricketer who plays for Central Punjab. He made his T20I debut for the Pakistan cricket team in November 2018.

Domestic career
In December 2017, he took his best figures in an innings in a first-class match, with nine wickets for WAPDA against Khan Research Laboratories in the 2017–18 Quaid-e-Azam Trophy.

In April 2018, he was named in Federal Areas' squad for the 2018 Pakistan Cup. He finished the tournament as the leading wicket-taker, with fourteen dismissals in five matches. In March 2019, he was named in Federal Areas' squad for the 2019 Pakistan Cup.

In September 2019, he was named in Central Punjab's squad for the 2019–20 Quaid-e-Azam Trophy tournament. In January 2021, he was named in Central Punjab's squad for the 2020–21 Pakistan Cup.

International career
In October 2018, he was named in Pakistan's Twenty20 International (T20I) squad for their series against Australia. Despite being the only member of the Pakistan squad not to play in a match against Australia, he was also selected for Pakistan's T20I series against New Zealand. He made his T20I debut for Pakistan against New Zealand on 4 November 2018.

References

External links
 

1987 births
Living people
Cricketers from Faisalabad
Pakistani cricketers
Pakistan Twenty20 International cricketers
Central Punjab cricketers
Islamabad United cricketers
Karachi Kings cricketers
Khyber Pakhtunkhwa cricketers
Water and Power Development Authority cricketers